Ernest Gignoux (August 26, 1874 – September 14, 1955) was an American epée, foil and sabre fencer. He competed at the 1912 and 1924 Summer Olympics.

References

External links
 

1874 births
1955 deaths
American male épée fencers
American male foil fencers
American male sabre fencers
Olympic fencers of the United States
Fencers at the 1912 Summer Olympics
Fencers at the 1924 Summer Olympics
Sportspeople from New York City
Cornell University alumni